The 1951 Western Michigan Broncos football team represented Michigan College of Education (later renamed Western Michigan University) in the Mid-American Conference (MAC) during the 1951 college football season.  In their 10th season under head coach John Gill, the Broncos compiled a 4–4 record (0–4 against MAC opponents), finished in sixth place in the MAC, and outscored their opponents, 164 to 160.  The team played its home games at Waldo Stadium in Kalamazoo, Michigan.

Tackle Bill Pitkin was the team captain. Offensive guard Ron Gow received the team's most outstanding player award.

Schedule

References

Western Michigan
Western Michigan Broncos football seasons
Western Michigan Broncos football